Milliken is an unincorporated community in Kanawha County, West Virginia, United States. It was also known as Greenberry.

References 

Unincorporated communities in West Virginia
Unincorporated communities in Kanawha County, West Virginia